Fred Frith appears on over 400 recordings. This is a selection from bands he was/is a member of, collaborations with other bands and musicians, and  his solo recordings. The year indicates when the album was first released. For a comprehensive discography, see the Discography of Fred Frith by Michel Ramond, Patrice Roussel and Stephane Vuilleumier.

Studio albums
 Guitar Solos (1974, LP, Caroline, UK)
 Gravity (1980, LP, Ralph, US)
 Speechless (1981, LP, Ralph, US)
 Cheap at Half the Price (1983, LP, Ralph, US)
 Quartets (1994, CD, RecRec, Switzerland)
 Clearing (2001, CD, Tzadik, US)
 Prints: Snapshots, Postcards, Messages and Miniatures, 1987–2001 (2002, CD, Fred, UK)
 Eleventh Hour (2005, 2xCD, Winter & Winter, Germany)
 To Sail, to Sail (2008, CD, Tzadik, US)
 Clearing Customs (2011, CD, Intakt, Switzerland)

Music for Dance
 The Technology of Tears (And Other Music for Dance and Theatre) (1988, 2xLP, RecRec, Switzerland)
 Allies (Music for Dance Volume 2) (1996, CD, RecRec, Switzerland)
 The Previous Evening (Music for Dance Volume 4) (1997, CD, Recommended, UK)
 Accidental (Music for Dance Volume 3) (2002, CD, Fred, UK)
 The Happy End Problem (Music for Dance Volume 5) (2006, CD, Fred, UK)
 Nowhere, Sideshow, Thin Air (Music for Dance Volume 6) (2009, CD, Fred, UK)
 Field Days (The Amanda Loops) (2015, CD, Fred, UK)
 Propaganda (2015, CD, Fred, UK)

Music for Film
 The Top of His Head (1989, LP, Crammed, Belgium) – original soundtrack to the film The Top of His Head by Peter Mettler
 Step Across the Border (1990, 2xLP, RecRec, Switzerland) – original soundtrack to the film Step Across the Border by Nicolas Humbert and Werner Penzel
 Middle of the Moment (1995, CD, RecRec, Switzerland) – original soundtrack to the film Middle of the Moment by Nicolas Humbert and Werner Penzel
 Eye to Ear (1997, CD, Tzadik, US) – collection of film and theatre music
 Rivers and Tides (2003, CD, Winter & Winter, Germany) – original soundtrack to the film Rivers and Tides by Thomas Riedelsheimer
 Eye to Ear II (2004, CD, Tzadik, US) – music from Gambling, Gods and LSD by Peter Mettler, Returning Home by Andy Abrahams Wilson, Hirschen Mit Goldenen Hufen by Petra Mäussnest, and Sideshow by Kristin Varner
 Eye to Ear III (2010, CD, Tzadik, US) – music from Drei Gegen Troja by Hussi Kutulcan, and Thirst by Deborah Kauffman and Alan Snitow

Composer only
 Pacifica (1998, CD, Tzadik, US)
 Freedom in Fragments (2002, CD, Tzadik, US)
 Back to Life (2008, CD, Tzadik, US)

Live albums
 Live in Japan (1982, 2xLP, Recommended, Japan)
 Stone, Brick, Glass, Wood, Wire (Graphic Scores 1986–1996) (1999, CD, I Dischi di Angelica, Italy)
 Impur II (2009, CD, Fred, UK)
 Storytelling (2017, CD, Intuition, Germany)
 All Is Always Now – Live at The Stone (2019, 3xCD, Intakt, Switzerland)
 Woodwork (2019, CD, Klanggalerie, Austria)

Composer only
 Impur (2006, CD, Fred, UK)

Singles
 "Dancing in the Street" / "What a Dilemma" (1980, 7", Ralph, US) – from Gravity

Compilations
 Fred and Ralph (1991, 3xCD, RecRec, Switzerland) – Fred Frith releases by Ralph Records
 Gravity (1980, CD, Ralph)
 Speechless (1981, CD, Ralph)
 Cheap at Half the Price (1983, CD, Ralph)
 The Fred Records Story 2001–2020 Volume 1: Rocking the Boat (2021, 9xCD, Fred, UK)
 Guitar Solos (2002, CD, Fred)
 Gravity (2002, CD, Fred)
 Cheap at Half the Price (2004, CD, Fred)
 Killing Time (2005, CD, Fred)
 Impur (2006, CD, Fred)
 Middle of the Moment (2004, CD, Fred)
 That House We Lived In (2003, 2xCD, Fred)
 Dropera (1991, CD, RecRec) – bonus CD
 The Fred Records Story 2001–2020 Volume 2: Crossing Borders (2021, 9xCD, Fred, UK)
 Live in Japan (2010, CD, Fred)
 Speechless (2003, CD, Fred)
 Prints (2002, CD, Fred)
 Step Across the Border (2003, CD, Fred)
 Impur II (2009, CD, Fred)
 The Art of Memory II (2008, CD, Fred)
 Learn to Talk / Country of Blinds (2005, 2xCD, Fred)
 Helter Skelter (1992, CD, RecRec) – bonus CD (remastered)
 The Fred Records Story 2001–2020 Volume 3: Stepping Out (2021, 10xCD, Fred, UK)
 The Technology of Tears (2008, CD, Fred)
 Propaganda (2015, CD, Fred)
 Allies (2004, CD, Fred)
 Accidental (2002, CD, Fred)
 The Previous Evening (1997, CD, Recommended)
 The Happy End Problem (2006, CD, Fred)
 Nowhere, Sideshow, Thin Air (2009, CD, Fred)
 Field Days (The Amanda Loops) (2015, CD, Fred)
 Inimitable – Debates for Ganden [with Amanda Miller] (2020, CD, Fred) – bonus CD (previously unreleased)
 Live in Tel Aviv and Aubervilliers [with Tom Cora and Chris Cutler] (2020, CD, Fred) – bonus CD (previously unreleased)

Collaborations
With Bruce Ackley, Henry Kaiser and Aram Shelton
 Unexpected Twins (2019, CD, Relative Pitch Records, US)

With Noël Akchoté
 Réel (1996, 10" LP, Rectangle, France)
With Núria Andorrà
 Dancing Like Dust (2023, CD, Klanggalerie, Austria)

With Lotte Anker
 Edge of the Light (2014, CD, Intakt, Switzerland)

With ARTE Quartett
 Still Urban (2009, CD, Intakt, Switzerland)
 The Big Picture (2009, CD, Intakt, Switzerland)

With Derek Bailey and Antoine Berthiaume
 Soshin (2003, CD, Ambiances Magnétiques, Canada)

With Derek Bailey, Sonny Sharrock, John Zorn, Bill Laswell and Charles K. Noyes
 Improvised Music 1981 (1992, CD, MuWorks, US)

With Anne Bourne and John Oswald
 Dearness (2002, CD, Spool, Canada)

With Anthony Braxton
 Duo (Victoriaville) 2005 (2006, CD, Les Disques Victo, Canada)

With Chris Brown
 Cutter Heads (2007, CD, Intakt, Switzerland)

With John Butcher
 The Natural Order (2014, CD, Northern Spy, US)

With John Butcher and Theresa Wong
 Quintillions Green (2016, FLAC, Otoroku, UK)

With Lindsay Cooper, Lars Hollmer and Gianni Gebbia
 Angels on the Edge of Time (2015, CD, I Dischi di Angelica, Italy)

With Lol Coxhill
 French Gigs (1983, LP, AAA, France)

With Chris Cutler
 Live in Prague and Washington (1983, LP, Recommended, UK) – 1990 CD release retitled Live in Moscow, Prague & Washington
 Live in Trondheim, Berlin & Limoges, Vol. 2 (1994, CD, Recommended, UK)
 2 Gentlemen in Verona (2000, CD, Recommended, UK)
 The Stone: Issue Two (2007, CD, Tzadik, US)

With Chris Cutler and Tom Cora
 Live in Tel Aviv and Aubervilliers (2021, CD, Fred, UK)

With Chris Cutler and Thomas Dimuzio
 Golden State (2010, LP, Recommended, UK)

With Lesli Dalaba, Eric Glick Rieman and Carla Kihlstedt
 Dalaba Frith Glick Rieman Kihlstedt (2003, CD, Accretions, US)

With Totsuzen Danball
 Live at Loft Shinjuku Tokyo Japan 23.July'81 (1982, CT, Floor, Japan)

With Evelyn Davis and Phillip Greenlief
 Lantskap Logic (2018, CD, Clean Feed, Portugal)

With Jean Derome, Pierre Tanguay and Myles Boisen
 All is Bright, But it is Not Day (2002, CD, Ambiances Magnétiques, Canada)

With Michel Doneda
 Fred Frith Michel Doneda (2014, CD, Vand'OEuvre, France)

With Mark Dresser and Ikue Mori
 Later... (2000, CD, Les Disques Victo, Canada)

With Jean-Pierre Drouet
 En Public aux Laboratoires d'Aubervilliers (1997, CD, Transes Europeennes, France)

With Jean-Pierre Drouet and Louis Sclavis
 I Dream of You Jumping (2001, CD, Les Disques Victo, Canada)
 Contretemps etc... (2011, CD, In Situ, France)

With Ensemble Modern
 Traffic Continues (2000, CD, Winter & Winter, Germany)

With Anil Eraslan, Tom Malmendier and Clara Weil
 There or Here and That (2020, CD, Eux Sæm, France)

With Janet Feder
 Ironic Universe (2006, CD+DVD, Recommended, US)

With Hardy Fox
 A Day Hanging Dead Between Heaven and Earth (2018, CD, Klanggalerie, Austria)

With Evelyn Glennie
 The Sugar Factory (2007, CD, Tzadik, US)

With Barry Guy
 Backscatter Bright Blue (2014, CD, Intakt, Switzerland)

With Tim Hodgkinson
 Live Improvisations (1992, CD, Woof, UK)

With Percy Howard, Charles Hayward and Bill Laswell
 Meridiem (1998, CD, Materiali Sonori, Italy)

With Nicolas Humbert and Marc Parisotto
 Cut Up the Border (2020, CD, RogueArt, France)

With Darren Johnston
 Everybody's Somebody's Nobody (2016, CD, Clean Feed, Portugal)

With Darren Johnston Devin Hoff, Larry Ochs and Ches Smith
 Reasons for Moving (2007, CD, Not Two, US)

With Henry Kaiser
 With Friends Like These (1979, LP, Metalanguage, US)
 Who Needs Enemies? (1983, LP, Metalanguage, US)
 With Enemies Like These, Who Needs Friends? (1987, CD, SST, US)
 Friends & Enemies (1999, 2xCD, Cuneiform, US)

With Carla Kihlstedt and Stevie Wishart
 The Compass, Log and Lead (2006, CD, Intakt, Switzerland)

With Hans Koch
 You are Here (2017, CD, Intakt, Switzerland)

With Joëlle Léandre and Jonathan Segel
 Tempted to Smile (2003, CD, Spool, Canada)

With Annie Lewandowski
 Long as in Short, Walk as in Run (2011, CD, Ninth World)

With René Lussier
 Nous Autres (1987, LP, Les Disques Victo, Canada)

With Amanda Miller
 Inimitable – Debates for Ganden (2021, CD, Fred, UK)

With Helen Mirra
 Kwangsi Quail (2015, LP, Shhpuma, Portugal)

With Ikue Mori
 A Mountain Doesn't Know It's Tall (2021, CD, Intakt, Switzerland)

With Mózg Injectors
 Sylvan Trail (2019, 12" LP and CD, Mózg, Poland)

With Bob Ostertag and Phil Minton
 Voice of America (1982, LP, Rift, US)

With Bob Ostertag and John Zorn
 Attention Span (1990, CD, RecRec, Switzerland)

With Evan Parker
 Hello, I Must Be Going (2015, CD, Les Disques Victo, Canada)

With Francois-Michel Pesenti
 Helter Skelter (1992, CD, RecRec, Switzerland)

With Marc Ribot
 Subsonic 1. Sounds of a Distant Episode (1994, CD, Sub Rosa/Subsonic, Belgium)

With Ferdinand Richard (as Fred & Ferd)
 Dropera (1991, LP, RecRec, Switzerland)

With Danielle Roger
 Pas de Deux (2008, CD, Ambiances Magnétiques, Canada)

With Rusconi
 Live In Europe (2016, CD, Qilin, Germany)

With Susana Santos Silva
 Laying Demons to Rest (2023, CD, RogueArt, France)

With Katrin Scholl, Daniel Erismann, Lucas N. Niggli, Hans Koch and Peter Kowald
 Nil (1995, CD, Unit Records, Switzerland)

With Sonargemeinschaft (Sonar Community)
 Drift (2008, CD, Poise, Germany)

With Studio Dan
 Rocket Science #1 #5 #8 (2021, CD, ROS, Germany)

With Sudhu Tewari and Cenk Ergün
 Lock Me Up, Lock Me Down (2020, Digital, Carrier Records, US)

With Toychestra
 What Leave Behind (2004, CD, S.K., France)

With Benjamin Vergara
 Fanfarrisimo (2019, LP, Tour De Bras, Canada)

With Katharina Weber and Fredy Studer
 It Rolls (2015, CD, Intakt, Switzerland)

With Michel Wintsch, Franziska Baumann and Bernard Trontin
 Whisperings (2002, CD, RecRec, Switzerland)

With John Zorn
 The Art of Memory (1994, CD, Incus, UK)
 50th Birthday Celebration Volume 5 (2004, CD, Tzadik, US)
 The Art of Memory II (2008, CD, Fred, UK)
 Late Works (2010, CD, Tzadik, US)

With John Zorn, Onnyk and Toyozumi Yoshisaburo
 Ars Longa Dens Brevis (2000, CD, Allelopathy, Japan)

Bands
Henry Cow
 Legend (1973, LP, Virgin, UK)
 Unrest (1974, LP, Virgin, UK)
 Concerts (1976, 2xLP, Caroline, UK)
 Western Culture (1979, LP, Broadcast, UK)
 The Virgin Years – Souvenir Box (1991, 3xCD, East Side Digital, US)
 Henry Cow Box (2006, 7xCD, Recommended, UK)
 Stockholm & Göteborg (2008, CD, Recommended, UK)
 The 40th Anniversary Henry Cow Box Set (2009, 9xCD+DVD, Recommended, UK)
 The Henry Cow Box Redux: The Complete Henry Cow (2019, 17xCD+DVD, Recommended, UK)

Henry Cow / Slapp Happy
 Desperate Straights (1975, LP, Virgin, UK)
 In Praise of Learning (1975, LP, Virgin, UK)

Art Bears
 Hopes and Fears (1978, LP, Recommended, UK)
 Winter Songs (1979, LP, Recommended, UK)
 The World as It Is Today (1981, LP, Recommended, UK)
 The Art Box (2004, 6xCD, Recommended, UK)

Aksak Maboul
 Un Peu de l'Âme des Bandits (1980, LP, Crammed, Belgium)

Material
 Memory Serves (1981, LP, Celluloid, France)
 One Down (1982, LP, Celluloid, France)
 Live from Soundscape (1994, CD, DIW, Japan)

Massacre
 Killing Time (1981, LP, Celluloid, France)
 Funny Valentine (1998, CD, Tzadik, US)
 Meltdown (2001, CD, Tzadik, US)
 Lonely Heart (2007, CD, Tzadik, US)
 Love Me Tender (2013, CD, Tzadik, US)

Skeleton Crew
 Learn to Talk (1984, LP, Rift, US / Recommended, Europe)
 The Country of Blinds (1986, LP, Rift, US / Recommended, Europe)
 Learn to Talk / Country of Blinds (1990, CD, RecRec, Switzerland)
 Etymology (1997, CD-ROM, Rarefaction, US)
 Free Dirt (Live) (2021, 2xCD, Klanggalerie, Austria)

Duck and Cover
 Rē Records Quarterly, Vol. 1 No. 2 (1985, LP, Recommended, UK)

French Frith Kaiser Thompson
 Live, Love, Larf & Loaf (1987, LP, Rhino, US)
 Invisible Means (1990, LP, Demon, UK, Windham Hill, US)

Naked City
 Naked City (1990, LP, Elektra/Nonesuch, US)
 Torture Garden (1990, LP, Elektra/Nonesuch, US)
 Heretic, Jeux des Dames Cruelles (1992, CD, Avant, Japan)
 Grand Guignol (1992, CD, Avant, Japan)
 Leng Tch'e (1992, CD, Toy's Factory, Japan)
 Radio (1993, CD, Avant, Japan)
 Absinthe (1993, CD, Avant, Japan)
 Naked City Live, Vol. 1: The Knitting Factory 1989 (2002, CD, Tzadik, US)

Death Ambient
 Death Ambient (1995, CD, Tzadik, US)
 Synaesthesia (1999, CD, Tzadik, US)
 Drunken Forest (2007, CD, Tzadik, US)

Fred Frith Guitar Quartet
 Ayaya Moses (1997, CD, Ambiances Magnétiques, Canada)
 Upbeat (1999, CD, Ambiances Magnétiques, Canada)

Maybe Monday
 Saturn's Finger (1999, CD, Buzz, Netherlands)
 Digital Wildlife (2002, CD, Winter & Winter, Germany)
 Unsquare (2008, CD, Intakt, Switzerland)

Keep the Dog
 That House We Lived In (2003, 2xCD, Fred, UK)

The Orckestra
 "Unreleased Orckestra Extract" (3" CD single, 2006, Recommended, UK)

Cosa Brava
 Ragged Atlas (2010, CD, Intakt, Switzerland)
 The Letter (2012, CD, Intakt, Switzerland)

MMM Quartet
 Live at the Metz' Arsenal (2012, CD, Leo, UK)
 Oakland/Lisboa (2015, CD, RogueArt, France)

Fred Frith Trio
 Another Day in Fucking Paradise (2016, CD, Intakt, Switzerland)
 Closer to the Ground (2018, CD, Intakt, Switzerland)
 Road (2021, 2xCD, Intakt Records, Switzerland)

Footnotes

References

External links
Fred Frith at Discogs

Discography
 Discography
Discographies of British artists
Rock music discographies